Jagapati  is a 2005 Indian Telugu-language film produced by M. Ramalinga Raju, V. Satyanarayana Raju on Roja Enterprises banner and directed by Jonnalagadda Srinivasa Rao. Starring Jagapati Babu, Rakshita  and music composed by M. M. Keeravani.

Plot
The film begins at Pulicherla Rayalaseema where MLA Goud a malicious tyrannizes his constitution. Once, a senior journalist exposes his crimes and he is ruthlessly butchered by Goud as a warning to detractors. Being cognizant of it, the journalist's son Murari hurried back from the city and seeks for vengeance. He perfectly makes an attack profile to assassinate MLA Goud and close upon execution. At that point, a wicked cop Jagapati, the foster and true blue of Goud lands shields him and slays Murari publicly. The incident throws Murari’s family into severe catastrophe leaving his mother & sister as alone souls. After a while, Lavanya an alacrity arrives new to the town and develops close intimacy with Murari's family. In the first instance itself, Jagapati allures her when she too induces his intention and he candidly loves her. 

All of sudden, Jagapati is conscious as Lavanya is a married lady. In that rage, he moves toward her and is startled to see her as a widow. Here as a flabbergast, Lavanya states that he is guilty of this situation and why she is so. Since she is the wife of Murari. Lavanya exploited love as a weapon against Jagapati to know the pain of losing the beloved. Parallelly, Lavanya starts divulging about their love affair to her mother-in-law. Murari & Lavanya liked each other in their college days. However, Lavanya faces severe harassment from her debauched maternal uncle C.I.Manipal who aspires to possess her. Therefore, to relieve her from his evil clutches Murari knitted Lavanya silently. Listening to it, Murari's mother feels happy for owing such a daughter-in-law. 

Now, soul-searching begins inside Jagapati which entails him repenting, regretting, and reforming. Then, he turns into a stout-hearted and encounters the monstrosities in his terrain. Above all, he files up the case against himself for the homicide of Murari and also produces the witnesses. Besides, Jagapati is aware that Goud's son Ravi & Murari's sister Lalitha are turtle doves. Hence, he wedlocks them opposing his master when Goud rivals on Jagapati. Spotting his transformation Lavanya endears Jagapati. Eventually, Murari's mother also affirms him as her son and asks to espouse Lavanya. Meanwhile, incensed Goud mingles with Manipal and gets him down on deputation to his region. The two seize, break Jagapati down, and Manipal approaches forcibly to marry Lavanya. At last, Jagapati freaks out, ceases the blackguard, and surrenders before the judiciary. Finally, the movie ends on a happy note with the court giving a short-term penalty to Jagapati and Lavanya proclaiming to wait until his arrival.

Cast

 Jagapati Babu as Jagapati
 Rakshita as Lavanya
 Navneet Kaur as Divya
 Pradeep Rawat as MLA Goud
 Tanikella Bharani as Kunkumaiah
 Chandra Mohan as Murari's father
 Sai Kiran as Murari
 Salim Baig as MLA Goud's brother 
 Subbaraju as Bandaraju
 Chalapathi Rao
 M. S. Narayana
 Krishna Bhagawan as Constable 
 Raghu Babu as Register
 Kondavalasa as Constable 
 Raja Ravindra as Reporter Raju
 Madhu as Goon
 Suman Setty
 Duvvasi Mohan as Beggar
 Sudha as Murari's mother
 Sirisha
 Karuna as Lalitha
 Padma Jayanthi as Goud's wife

Soundtrack

Music composed by M. M. Keeravani. Lyrics written by Chandrabose. Music released on Supreme Music Company.

References

Films scored by M. M. Keeravani